Balfour Bowen Thorn Lord (August 24, 1906 – June 16, 1965) was an American lawyer and Democratic politician from New Jersey.

Biography
Lord was born on August 24, 1906 in Plainfield, New Jersey to Carroll P. Lord, a New England cotton merchant, and Frances E. Troy of Asheville, North Carolina. The family moved South two years later. He graduated from The University of the South in Sewanee, Tennessee and received a law degree from the University of North Carolina in 1931.

In 1932 he set up a law practice in Trenton, New Jersey. He served as Assistant United States Attorney and then as U.S. Attorney for the District of New Jersey from 1943 to 1945.

Lord became active in Mercer County politics, first elected to the Lawrence Township committee in 1947. The following year he took control of the Mercer County Democratic organization and became a powerful force in state Democratic politics. He was credited with masterminding the election of Robert B. Meyner as Governor of New Jersey in 1953, after a decade of Republican rule.  Meyner appointed Lord to the board of the Port Authority.

In 1960, Lord was the Democratic nominee for United States Senate to face incumbent Clifford P. Case, but he was defeated by a large margin, despite the fact that John F. Kennedy narrowly won New Jersey in that year's presidential election. After the defeat Lord was elected chairman of the New Jersey Democratic State Committee. He continued to play the role of Democratic kingmaker, helping his former law partner Richard J. Hughes win the gubernatorial election of 1961.

Lord and his first wife Margaret Eastburn had one child, Thorn Jr. After a divorce, he married Nina Underwood, ex-wife of David Hunter McAlpin, Jr. They had a daughter, also named Nina. By 1965, the Lords were separated. Apparently depressed by the estrangement, Lord committed suicide by garroting himself with an electric shaver cord at the home of a friend in Princeton.

References

External links
Biographical information for Thorn Lord from The Political Graveyard

1906 births
1965 suicides
American politicians who committed suicide
New Jersey lawyers
People from Lawrence Township, Mercer County, New Jersey
Politicians from Plainfield, New Jersey
Sewanee: The University of the South alumni
University of North Carolina School of Law alumni
Chairmen of the New Jersey Democratic State Committee
Suicides in New Jersey
United States Attorneys for the District of New Jersey
20th-century American lawyers
1965 deaths